Luoning County is a county in the west of Henan province, China. It is under the administration of the prefecture-level city of Luoyang.

Administrative divisions
Eleven towns:
Chengguan, Shangge, Xiayu, Hedi, Dongsong, Xinghua, Madian, Guxian, Zhaocun (formerly Zhaocun Township ), Changshui (formerly Changshui Township ), Jingyang

One ethnic township:
Wangfan Hui Town

Six townships: 
Chengjiao Township, Xiaojie Township, Luoling Township, Dizhang Township, Chenwu Township, Jiankou Township

Former Township:
Shandi Township

Climate

References

 
County-level divisions of Henan
Luoyang